Sir Charles Pym, 1st Baronet ( – 1671) was an English politician who sat in the House of Commons  from 1641 to 1648 and in 1660. He served in the Parliamentary army in the English Civil War. 

Pym was the son of John Pym and his wife, Anna Hooker (or Hooke). In 1641, Pym was elected Member of Parliament for Bere Alston in the Long Parliament after the previous member was expelled. He served in the parliamentary army in the civil war, but was excluded from parliament under Pride's Purge in 1648.   He was created a baronet by Richard Cromwell.

In April 1660, Pym was elected MP  for Minehead and for  Bossiney in the Convention Parliament  and chose to sit for Minehead.

Pym was confirmed in his baronetcy by Charles II on 14 July 1663.
 
Pym's only son, Charles, died in 1688 without a male heir; the baronetcy became extinct.

References

1615 births
1671 deaths
English MPs 1640–1648
English MPs 1660
Roundheads
Baronets in the Baronetage of England
Members of the Parliament of England for Bere Alston